Naam Iruvar is a 1947 Indian Tamil-language drama film directed and produced by A. V. Meiyappan. It is based on the play Thyaga Ullam written by Pa. Neelakantan. The film stars T. R. Mahalingam and T. A. Jayalakshmi. It was released on 12 January 1947 and became a success.

Plot 

Sukumar, the son of a black-marketeer, falls in the company of evil friends and invests his money in making a film in accordance with their advice. However, the film never sees the light of the day and leaves Sukumar heavy in debt. He is eventually questioned by financiers and when he fails to pay them, is dragged to court. How he is rescued from his perilous situation forms the climax of the story. At the end of the film, Sukumar becomes a nationalist and a Gandhian.

Cast 

Male cast
 T. R. Mahalingam as Sukumar
 B. R. Panthulu as Jayakumar
 K. Sarangapani as Ramasamy Pillai
 T. R. Ramachandran as Gnanodhayam
 V. K. Ramasamy as Shanmugam Pillai
 T. K. Ramachandran as Viswam
 V. K. Karthikeyan as Hanumantha Rao
 S. P. Chellappa as Rahim
 N. C. Menon as Police Sub Inspector
 S. L. Narayanan as Muniyan
 R. Viswanathan as Kamatchiya Pillai
 C. Natarajan as Periyanna Pillai
 Janardhanan as Seenu Pillai
 V. S. Srinivasan as Accountant

Female cast
 T. A. Jayalakshmi as Kannamma
 Baby Kamala as Kamala
 K. R. Chellam as Ambujam
 A. S. Jaya as Leela
 Chitti as Thripuasundara Devi
 D. Lakshmi Bai as Mohini
 M. R. Visalatchi as Miss Susheela

Production 
Based on a play Thyaga Ullam written by Pa. Neelakantan, which itself was based on the story of the 1936 film Iru Sahodarargal, Naam Iruvar was directed and produced by A.V. Meiyappan. The film released in January, a few months before India's independence after six months of shooting and was a "thundering success". The story begins with a Subramania Bharati anniversary and ends with Gandhi's 77th birthday celebrations. A notable feature of the movie were its songs which were written by Indian nationalist Subramaniya Bharati and sung by D. K. Pattammal.

The film is remembered for the dance performances of Baby Kamala. It is also remembered as the first film produced under the banner of AVM Productions. Following the success of the film, AVM moved his studio from Karaikudi to Kodambakkam in Chennai. Nam Iruvar was also the last film directed by A. V. Meiyappan and extensively portrayed the hopes and aspirations of a nation on the brink of independence.

S. V. Sahasranamam who acted and directed the play was initially considered for the leading role. but couldn't take up the film due to other commitments hence he was replaced by T. R. Mahalingam. The film also marked the debut of V. K. Ramasamy who appeared in the role of an evil old man at the age of 21.

Songs 
Music was composed by R. Sudarasanam and lyrics were written by Mahakavi Bharathiar, K. P. Kamatchi, V. S. Veeranatha Konar and M. Raghavan. The song "Aaduvome" was written by Subramaniya Bharathi while other two songs were written by K. P. Kamatchisundaram. Randor Guy of The Hindu wrote that the film was remembered for "The scintillating song and dance numbers, ‘Aaaduvomey…..’ and ‘Vetri Ettum’, performed by ‘Baby’ Kamala".

Reception 
The reviewer for The Indian Express  called the film "an interesting social drama well acted with the additional attraction of a few songs of the great Bharathi rendered by Mahalingam. Baby Kamala is responsible for some good dance numbers." Randor Guy of The Hindu wrote that the concept "had nothing to do with the freedom movement, but it had everything to do with perceptively capturing the spirit of the times, making it a hit".

References

Bibliography

External links 
 

1940s Tamil-language films
1947 films
AVM Productions films
Indian black-and-white films
Films scored by R. Sudarsanam
Indian drama films
Indian films based on plays